The Consolidated Model 2 was a training airplane used by the United States Army Air Corps, under the designation PT-3 and the United States Navy under the designation NY-1.

Development
Seeing the success of the Navy's NY-1 modification of a PT-1 airframe, the USAAC came to the conclusion that a radial engine was indeed ideal for a trainer. It was reliable and offered a good power-to-weight ratio. Therefore, one PT-1 airframe was completed as XPT-2 with a 220 hp (164 kW) Wright J-5 Whirlwind radial engine.

The XPT-3 was almost identical to the XPT-2 except for the tail, revised wing panels and different shape. 130 production PT-3 aircraft were ordered in September 1927, with one being completed as the XO-17. These were followed by 120 PT-3A aircraft with minor changes. The XPT-3 became the XPT-5 when fitted with the Curtiss Challenger R-600 two-row six-cylinder radial engine, but was soon converted to PT-3 standard.

The PT-3 aircraft were superseded by the Boeing PT-13 Stearman starting in 1937, but a number were still operational with the Spartan Flying School in Tulsa Oklahoma into the middle of World War II.

Variants
XPT-2 one PT-1 airframe with a  Wright J-5 (R-790) radial engine, wingspan 34 ft 7 in (10.5 m), length 28 ft 4 in (8.6 m), gross weight 2,427 lb (1100 kg)
XPT-3 one PT-1 airframe with revised wing panels (Clark "Y" wings) and a different vertical tail, wingspan 34 ft 6 in (10.5 m), length 28 ft 3 in (8.6 m), gross weight 2,439 lb (1106 kg)
PT-3 130 ordered, one completed as the XO-17 prototype, gross weight 2,481 lb (1125 kg)
PT-3A 120 ordered with minor updates, Wright J-5, gross weight 2,432 lb (1103 kg)
XPT-4 unbuilt, was to be a development PT-3 with the experimental Fairchild-Caminez 447C engine
XPT-5 the airframe of the XPT-3 was temporarily fitted with the Curtiss Challenger R-600-1 two-row six-cylinder radial engine in 1929, later converted to PT-3 standard

Operators

Cuban Air Force, ten PT-3s.

Argentine Air Force, one PT-3.

Brazilian Naval Aviation, one PT-3, serial number 434.

Peruvian Air Force, one PT-3.

a small number may have been sold to Mexico 

United States Army Air Corps
United States Navy
United States Marine Corps

Surviving aircraft
 The last Consolidated PT-3 was amongst the aircraft lost in the San Diego Air & Space Museum 1978 fire.
 An airworthy PT-3 replica belongs to the EAA Aviation Museum in Oshkosh, Wisconsin. It incorporates parts of a PT-1 that once flew with the 154th Observation Squadron of the Arkansas National Guard, was later owned by the University of Arkansas College of Engineering and was rebuilt as a PT-3 reproduction with a radial J-5 Engine.

Specifications (PT-3)

See also
Consolidated PT-1 "Trusty"
Consolidated O-17
Consolidated PT-11

References

External links

Consolidated PT-03
PT-03
Single-engined tractor aircraft
Biplanes